The Last Hero is the fifth studio album by the American rock band Alter Bridge, released on October 7, 2016, by Napalm Records worldwide except in North America, where it was released on the band's own vanity label. It was produced by longtime collaborator Michael "Elvis" Baskette. The album's first single, "Show Me a Leader", was released digitally and to rock radio on July 26, 2016. On September 8, 2016, "My Champion" was released as the album's second single. The album's third single, "Poison In Your Veins", was released on June 12, 2017.

Background
The Last Hero was written during the winter of 2015, while both singer Myles Kennedy and guitarist Mark Tremonti were on tour with their respective projects (Slash featuring Myles Kennedy and the Conspirators and Tremonti), with the recording process being finished during the spring of 2016. Regarding the sound of the album, Tremonti stated it to be similar to Fortress and Blackbird but they were planning on a darker sound. The album name comes from the subject of being a hero in society and people's feelings of disillusionment with their current leaders. It also marks a departure from the band's previous visual style, with the grungy aesthetic of previous albums replaced with a more streamlined logo.

Reception

The Last Hero has received generally positive reviews, with critics praising its lyrical themes and the band members' musicianship, though some criticized Michael Baskette's production and the album's long length. It has a score of 74 out of 100 on Metacritic, indicating "generally favorable reviews". Dom Lawson from The Guardian gave the album a mixed review with a rating of three out of five stars. He praised the album's heavy sound, but said he felt that nearly "every last second of The Last Hero is purposefully, relentlessly bombastic" and that listening to the album from start to finish is an "exhausting" exercise. He concluded by saying that he felt the band was "trying too hard". Timothy Monger from AllMusic felt that the album stays within the band's "tried and true" sound and does not stray far from what listeners will expect, but overall liked the album, praising Tremonti's guitar playing and Kennedy's vocal performance. He gave it three-and-a-half stars out of five. TeamRock's Grant Moon gave the album four stars out of five and highly praised its lyrical themes, but lambasted Baskette's production, saying he "produces this all to within an inch of its life". He concluded by calling the album "a bold, bombastic rock album that really chimes with our troubled times". In a review of the band's performance with Parallax Orchestra in October 2017, writer Dom Lawson referred to The Last Hero as "stodgy and overproduced".

Track listing

Personnel
 Alter Bridge
Myles Kennedy – lead vocals, rhythm and lead guitar
Mark Tremonti – lead and rhythm guitar, backing vocals
Brian Marshall – bass guitar
Scott Phillips – drums, percussion

Production
Michael "Elvis" Baskette – production, mixing, string arrangements, keyboards
Jef Moll – engineering, digital editing
Ted Jensen – mastering
Daniel Tremonti – cover art
Ben Grosse – production, mixing on "Breathe"
Tom Baker – mastering on "Breathe"

Charts

References

External links
 Official band website

2016 albums
Alter Bridge albums
Napalm Records albums
Albums produced by Michael Baskette